J. C. Chanmugam was the 26th Surveyor General of Sri Lanka. He was appointed in 1965, succeeding S. Karthigesu, and held the office until 1966. He was succeeded by F. H. Gunasekara.

References

C